This is a list of notable alumni who attended the University of North Carolina  Wilmington (UNCW).
 Lavonne J. Adams (1986), poet and author
 Claudia Bassols, (transferred)  actress
 Brandon Beane (1998), Buffalo Bills General Manager
 Brett Blizzard (2003), professional basketball player
 John R. Bell, IV (2001),  Majority leader of the North Carolina House of Representatives
 Mark Byington (1998), basketball coach
 Devontae Cacok (2019), professional basketball player
 John Calipari (transferred) basketball coach
 Craig Callahan (2003), professional basketball player; Most Valuable Player of the Czech Republic's National Basketball League
 Kona Carmack (2000), model and actress
 Marc Antonio Carter (2008), professional basketball player
 Martha Cheney (1975), author
 Billy Donlon (1999), basketball coach 
 Matt Fish (1992), professional basketball player
 John Goldsberry (2006), professional basketball player
 Carl Hart, (transferred) professor at Columbia University
 Chris Hatcher (2006), professional baseball player
 Bill Haywood (1964), professional baseball player
 Kirsten Holmstedt (2006), author and journalist
 Martin Jarmond, Athletic Director at Boston College
 Phoebe Jeter, Air Defense Artillery Officer
 Greg Jones professional baseball player
 Rick Jones (1975), baseball coach 
 Brad Knighton (2007), professional soccer player
 Anna Kooiman (2005), reporter
 Todd Lickliter (transferred), basketball coach  
 Matt Lutz (2001), actor
 Cecil Malton (1996), current professional basketball coach in Latvia
 Brandon Miller (2012), professional soccer player
 Jill Mikucki (1996), microbiologist, Antarctic researcher
 Hekuran Murati (2010), minister of finance, labor and transfers of the Republic of Kosovo
 Derek Nikitas, author
 Joshua Poteat (1993), poet
 Bevin Prince (2003), actress  
 John Raynor (2006), professional baseball player
 Cecil R. Reynolds (1975), psychologist
 Brian Rowsom (1989), professional basketball player 
 Bill Saffo, Mayor of Wilmington
 Terry Schappert, television host, commentator
Adam Smith (born 1992), basketball player for Hapoel Holon in the Israel Basketball Premier League
 Addison Spruill, professional basketball player
 Cody Stanley (2010), professional baseball player
 John M. Tyson (1974), judge on the North Carolina Court of Appeals
 Skeet Ulrich (did not graduate) actor 
 Shaun Utterson (2012), professional soccer player
 Jacob VanCompernolle (2014), professional soccer player
 Christopher Warner (1991), Anglican bishop
 Carl Willis (1990), baseball coach

References
 

University of North Carolina Wilmington alumni